Milton Luis Tróccoli Cebedio (born 3 March 1964 in Montevideo) is a Uruguayan Roman Catholic prelate.

He attended seminary at El Seminario Mayor de Montevideo, studying theology and philosophy. He was ordained as a priest in 1988 by Pope John Paul II, on the occasion of his second visit to Uruguay. On 27 November 2009 he was appointed titular bishop of Munatiana and Auxiliary Bishop of Montevideo. On 8 July 2018, he was appointed Bishop of Maldonado-Punta del Este, and the see changed to Maldonado-Punta del Este-Minas on 2 March 2020 when the diocese of Minas was joined to it.

References

External links

1964 births
Uruguayan people of Italian descent
People from Montevideo
Bishops appointed by Pope Benedict XVI
Uruguayan Roman Catholic bishops
Living people
Roman Catholic bishops of Maldonado-Punta del Este-Minas
Roman Catholic bishops of Montevideo